Kupeus is a genus of wrinkled bark beetles in the family Carabidae. Its only species is Kupeus arcuatus, endemic to New Zealand. K. arcuatus was originally described in 1873 by Louis Chevrolat.

References

Rhysodinae
Monotypic Carabidae genera
Endemic fauna of New Zealand
Endemic insects of New Zealand